Zequinha (1935-2009), born Jose Ferreira Franco, was a Brazilian football midfielder

Zequinha may also refer to:

Zequinha de Abreu (1880-1935), Brazilian musician and composer
Zequinha (footballer, born 1948), born José Márcio Pereira da Silva, Brazilian football forward
Zequinha Marinho (born 1959), Brazilian politician
Zequinha (footballer, born 1987), born José Egas dos Santos Branco, Portuguese football forward